

League tables

First Division 
Towa Real Estate was renamed Fujita Industries when the latter absorbed its subsidiary.

Promotion/relegation Series 
 
No relegations.

Second Division

JSL promotion/relegation Series 

NTT Kinki and Dainichi relegated, Furukawa Chiba and Yanmar Club promoted.

References

1975
1
Jap
Jap